Kirnesh Jung (born 1957) was the independent MLA representing Paonta Sahib in the twelfth legislative assembly of Himachal Pradesh.

References

Himachal Pradesh politicians
1957 births
Living people
Place of birth missing (living people)
Date of birth missing (living people)
Himachal Pradesh MLAs 2012–2017